Ammonium dinitramide (ADN) is the ammonium salt of dinitraminic acid. ADN decomposes under heat to leave only nitrogen, oxygen, and water. The ions are the ammonium ion NH4+ and the dinitramide N(NO2)2−.

It makes an excellent solid rocket oxidizer with a slightly higher specific impulse than ammonium perchlorate and more importantly, does not leave corrosive hydrogen chloride fumes. This property is also of military interest because halogen-free smoke is harder to detect. It decomposes into low-molecular-mass gases so it contributes to higher performance without creating excessive temperatures if used in gun or rocket propellants. The salt is prone to detonation under high temperatures and shock more so than the perchlorate.

The EURENCO Bofors company produced LMP-103S as a 1-to-1 substitute for hydrazine by dissolving 65% ammonium dinitramide, NH4N(NO2)2, in 35% water solution of methanol and ammonia.  LMP-103S has 6% higher specific impulse and 30% higher impulse density than hydrazine monopropellant. Additionally, hydrazine is highly toxic and carcinogenic, while LMP-103S is only moderately toxic. LMP-103S is UN Class 1.4S allowing for transport on commercial aircraft, and was demonstrated on the Prisma satellite in 2010. Special handling is not required.  LMP-103S could replace hydrazine as the most commonly used monopropellant.

The ADN-based monopropellant FLP-106 is reported to have improved properties relative to LMP-103S, including higher performance (ISP of 259 s vs. 252 s) and density (1.362 g/cm3 vs. 1.240 g/cm3).

History 
Ammonium dinitramide was invented in 1971 in Zelinskiy Institute of Organic Chemistry in the USSR. Initially all information related to this compound was classified because of its use as a rocket propellant, particularly in Topol-M intercontinental ballistic missiles. In 1989 ammonium dinitramide was independently synthesized at SRI International. SRI obtained US and international patents for ADN in the mid-1990s, at which time scientists from the former Soviet Union revealed they had discovered ADN 18 years earlier.

Preparation  
There are at least 20 different synthesis routes that produce Ammonium dinitramide. In the laboratory ammonium dinitramide can be prepared by nitration of sulfamic acid or its salts at low temperatures. 
KSO3NH2 + 2HNO3 → KHSO4 + NH4N(NO2)2 + H2O 
The process is performed under red light, since the compound is decomposed by higher energy photons. The details of the synthesis remain classified.
Other sources  report ammonium synthesis from ammonium nitrate, anhydrous nitric acid, and fuming sulfuric acid containing 20% free sulfur trioxide AKA Oleum. A base other than ammonia must be added before the acid dinitramide decomposes. The final product is obtained by fractional crystallization. 

Another synthesis known as the urethane synthesis method requires four synthesis steps and results in a yield of up to 60 %. Ethyl carbamate is nitrated with nitric acid, and then reacted with ammonia to form the ammonium salt of N-nitrourethane. This is nitrated again with nitrogen pentoxide to form ethyl dinitrocarbamate and ammonium nitrate. Finally, treatment with ammonia again splits off the desired ammonium dinitramide and regenerates the urethane starting material. 

CH3CH2OC(O)NH2 + HNO3 → CH3CH2OC(O)NHNO2 + H2O 
CH3CH2OC(O)NHNO2 + NH3 → CH3CH2OC(O)NNO2NH4 
CH3CH2OC(O)NNO2NH4 + N2O5 → CH3CH2OC(O)N(NO2)2  + NH4NO3
CH3CH2OC(O)N(NO2)2 + 2NH3 → CH3CH2OC(O)NH2 + NH4N(NO2)2

References

Further reading

 Modern rocket fuels> PDF> Hesiserman Online Library
 Textbook of Chemistry 1999 Prentice Press, New York

Explosive chemicals
Rocket oxidizers
Nitroamines
SRI International